The Matadors Meet the Bull is an album by saxophonist Sonny Stitt recorded in 1965 and released on the Roulette label. The album was Stitt's first for the label; he had recorded many albums for Roost which Roulette had taken over.

Reception

Allmusic awarded the album 3 stars.

Track listing 
All compositions by Henry Glover and Morris Levy except as indicated
 "Duketation" - 3:54   
 "T'wana" - 4:46   
 "Icey Stone" - 2:37   
 "Pink Gloves  2:12   
 "Let My People Split" - 4:55   
 "Samba de Orfeo" (Luiz Bonfá) - 3:02   
 "Liberian Love Song" - 2:29   
 "Handkerchief Head" - 2:40   
 "Stitt's Song" (Sonny Stitt) - 7:45

Personnel 
Sonny Stitt - alto saxophone, tenor saxophone
Joe Newman, Clark Terry - trumpet, flugelhorn
Urbie Green, J. J. Johnson - trombone
Eddie "Lockjaw" Davis - tenor saxophone
George Berg - baritone saxophone
Junior Mance, Billy Taylor - piano 
Wild Bill Davis - organ
Barry Galbraith, Les Spann - guitar
Milt Hinton, Eddie Sanfranski - bass 
Walter Perkins - drums
Ray Barretto - congas
Joe Cuba, Tito Puente - timbales

References 

1965 albums
Roulette Records albums
Sonny Stitt albums